Ephysteris gondwana is a moth in the family Gelechiidae. It was described by Oleksiy V. Bidzilya and Wolfram Mey in 2011. It is found in Namibia and South Africa.

References

Ephysteris
Moths described in 2011